E! Entertainment Radio was an XM satellite radio channel, which ran audio from shows produced for the E! television network.

In September 2005, Sirius moved E! Entertainment Radio from Channel 136 to Channel 107.  Effective August 3, 2007, E! Entertainment Radio on XM only broadcast on weekdays (Monday at midnight ET through Friday at 11:59PM ET). In November 7, 2008, the station left XM permanently, and is no longer on the XM service.

See also 
E! Entertainment Television
XM Satellite Radio channel history
List of Sirius Satellite Radio stations

External links
 E! Online

Defunct radio stations in the United States
Sirius Satellite Radio channels
Radio stations established in 2001
Radio stations disestablished in 2008